Tales from the Floating Vagabond is a science-fiction role-playing game by Lee Garvin, published by Avalon Hill in 1991. It has the tagline "Ludicrous Adventure in a Universe Whose Natural Laws Are Out To Lunch".

Overview
The game takes a comedic approach to the genre, encouraging the gamemaster to begin each adventure in an outer space bar called the Floating Vagabond.  Players choose from races such as humans, elves, Disgustingly Cute Furry Things, and Dogmen, learn skills like "Look Good at All Times" and "Projectile Vomiting", and consume dangerous beverages containing toxic substances such as a singularity.  The flexibility of the rules system allows for making characters from any genre, epoch, or world, as well as creating new races and superheroes.

One of the more memorable aspects of the game is a system of shticks that players can choose from, including:

The Rambo Effect: The player can dodge automatic gunfire at close range (and only at close range).
The Trenchcoat Effect: The player can pull any mundane item out of their trenchcoat, but only if a different party member has already brought up the need for that item.
The Rodgers and Hammerstein Effect: The player obtains a personal soundtrack that can warn them of danger or other upcoming events.  Alternatively, it can give everyone on their side a bonus to morale.
The Roy Rogers Effect: The player can make any trick shot they can imagine, eliminating all cover their target may be behind.  Of course, they can't actually kill anyone except at high noon...
The Doolittle Effect: Allows the player to communicate with animals, all of which start out being friendly.  Of course, since they're all friendly, they follow the player everywhere...
The Flynn Effect: Allows the player to swing on a chandelier, vine, or bullwhip without worrying about it breaking... or needing an attachment point at the upper end.  Or needing to find one, for that matter.
The Valentino Effect: About what it sounds like.  Everyone of the appropriate gender is crazy about the player.
The Schwarzenegger Effect: Allows the player to operate without wound penalties... as long as nobody ever sees the player receive first aid.
The Newton Effect: Allows the player to stop anything that contradicts their understanding of the laws of physics from happening around them.
The Escher Effect: Allows the player to act in a way that contradicts the laws of physics.
The John Doe Effect: Gives the player 'one of those faces'. People constantly confuse the player for an old friend.
The Merlin Effect: Allows the player to 'just know' a lot of information about people upon meeting them, such as their name, address, what they had for breakfast and so on.

The second printing of this game included many strange typos, such as providing the incorrect formula strength+luck/2 for "Oops! Points," causing gamers to create characters that were weaker than standard NPC goons. The correct formula is strength+luck+2d6.

Author Lee Garvin has released the original game in PDF, via OneBookShelf stores, and was working on a second edition. He died on June 28, 2019 before completion.

Publications
HyperCad 54, Where Are You?

Reception
In the March 1993 edition of Dragon (Issue 191), Rick Swan thought this game "generated more groans than belly laughs, not a good sign from an RPG that lives and dies on the strength of its jokes."

Other reviews
White Wolf #29 (Oct./Nov., 1991)

References

External links
Official site

Avalon Hill games
Comedy role-playing games
Role-playing games introduced in 1991
Science fiction role-playing games